Amelia Charlotte Kerr (born 13 October 2000) is a New Zealand cricketer who currently plays for Wellington and New Zealand. On 13 June 2018, Kerr made the highest individual score in a WODI match, and became the youngest cricketer, male or female, to score a double century in One Day International cricket, when she scored 232 not out against Ireland. The double century was also the third-highest individual score, male or female, in an ODI, second-highest by a New Zealander and highest in a Women's ODI. Later in the same match, she also took 5 wickets for 17 runs, her first five-wicket haul in WODIs.

Career
In August 2018, she was awarded a central contract by New Zealand Cricket, following the tours of Ireland and England in the previous months. In October 2018, she was named in New Zealand's squad for the 2018 ICC Women's World Twenty20 tournament in the West Indies. Ahead of the tournament, she was named as the player to watch in the team.

In March 2019, she was named as the ANZ International Women's ODI Player of the Year at the annual New Zealand Cricket awards. In January 2020, she was named in New Zealand's squad for the 2020 ICC Women's T20 World Cup in Australia. In February 2022, she was named in New Zealand's team for the 2022 Women's Cricket World Cup in New Zealand.

In April 2022, she was bought by the London Spirit for the 2022 season of The Hundred. In June 2022, Kerr was named in New Zealand's team for the cricket tournament at the 2022 Commonwealth Games in Birmingham, England.

In the inaugural season of the Women's Premier League in 2023, Kerr was bought by Mumbai Indians at the price of 1 Crore.

Personal life
Kerr's mother Jo and father Robbie both played cricket at domestic level representing Wellington. Her elder sister Jess, who plays for Wellington was, in  January 2020, named in New Zealand's national cricket squad against South Africa women. Her grandfather, Bruce Murray, played Test cricket for New Zealand. Her cousin, Cilla Duncan, represented New Zealand (Football Ferns) at international football.

Jess is a teacher at Tawa Intermediate, of which each of the two sisters is an alumna, and Amelia became a teacher aide for autistic students.

References

External links

 
 

2000 births
Living people
People educated at Tawa College
New Zealand women cricketers
New Zealand women One Day International cricketers
New Zealand women Twenty20 International cricketers
Cricketers from Wellington City
Wellington Blaze cricketers
Brisbane Heat (WBBL) cricketers
Southern Vipers cricketers
IPL Velocity cricketers
Mumbai Indians (WPL) cricketers
Cricketers at the 2022 Commonwealth Games
Commonwealth Games bronze medallists for New Zealand
Commonwealth Games medallists in cricket
London Spirit cricketers
New Zealand expatriate sportspeople in England
New Zealand expatriate sportspeople in Australia
Medallists at the 2022 Commonwealth Games